The Roman Catholic Deanery of Dachau  is a deanery of the Roman Catholic Church in the Archdiocese of Munich and Freising. The deanery encompasses an area approximately equal in size to the town of Dachau and the area of the municipalities Bergkirchen, Hebertshausen, Haimhausen, Fahrenzhausen, Röhrmoos and Schwabhausen. Currently, 18 parishes belong to the deanery, which is organized in five pastoral units. The dean of the deanery is Wolfgang Borm, a priest at St. Jakob.

List of churches and parishes

Catholic organizations and groups in the deanery Perlach

Bund der Deutschen Katholischen Jugend 
All Catholic youth organizations (KjG, KLJB and scouts) of the district Dachau form together the Bund der Deutschen Katholischen Jugend (BDKJ, English: "Association of the German Catholic Youth") of the district Dachau. The BDKJ Dachau represents the political, social and ecclesiastical interests of the Catholic youth in Dachau, which includes the church, society and the diocesan assembly of the BDKJ.

Deanery association 
The katholische junge Gemeinde (kjg) Perlach is one of the major youth organizations that brings together the parish youths at deanery level. It organizes regular meetings and activities. It is part of the diocesan association of the Katholische Junge Gemeinde (KjG München und Freising).

References 

Dachau
Roman Catholic Archdiocese of Munich and Freising